Geolabididae is an extinct family of prehistoric mammals belonging to the order Eulipotyphla.

Taxonomy
Batodon (Sometimes placed in Cimolestidae)
Batodon tenuis Marsh, 1892 - Upper Cretaceous Campanian to Maastrichtian, Canada and United States. 
Batodonoides - Lower Eocene (Wasatchian) to Mid Eocene (Uintan) - North America
Gobigeolabis Lopatin, 2004
Gobigeolabis verigranum Lopatin, 2004 - Upper Paleocene, Mongolia
Centetodon Marsh, 1872 (incl. Geolabis) - Lower Eocene to Early Miocene
Centetodon aztecus Lillegraven et al. 1981
Centetodon bembicophagus Lillegraven et al. 1981
Centetodon bacchanalis (McGrew, 1959)
Centetodon chadronensis Lillegraven et al., 1981 -. Mid Eocene (Duchesnean) to Oligocene (Orellan)
Centetodon divaricatus Korth, 1992 - Upper Oligocene, North America
Marsholestes - Middle Eocene, (Bridgerian)
Marsholestes dasypelix Matthew 1909 
Stilpnodon Simpson 1935

References
Taxonomic occurrences of Geolabididae recorded in the Paleobiology Database  

Prehistoric Eulipotyphla
Soricomorphs